Mount Sacred Heart College was a small Catholic women's college in Hamden, Connecticut.  It was founded in 1946 as Mount Sacred Heart Junior College and closed in the summer of 1997 due to low enrollment.

The college was founded by Sister Mary Antonine Signorelli and operated by the Missionary Zelatrices of the Sacred Heart of Jesus, an Italian religious institute now known as the Apostles of the Sacred Heart of Jesus.

Academics

Mount Sacred Heart was designed as a sisters' college, or a college primarily designed to educate nuns. In light of its mission, the curriculum focused on theology, although it was not limited to that area. Faculty members offered courses in Latin, education, writing, and other subjects.

Courses were initially offered on the traditional American two-semester system, but by 1966 the college had adopted a trimester system. Graduates received associate degrees.

Legacy

The Mount Sacred Heart campus is now used by the Zelatrices' successor, the Apostles of the Sacred Heart, to operate Sacred Heart Academy, a preparatory school for high school-aged girls.

The only remaining sisters' college in the United States is the Assumption College for Sisters in Mendham, New Jersey.

See also
 List of current and historical women's universities and colleges

References

External links
 Sacred Heart Academy
 Apostles of the Sacred Heart of Jesus

Buildings and structures in Hamden, Connecticut
Educational institutions established in 1946
Educational institutions disestablished in 1997
Defunct private universities and colleges in Connecticut
Defunct Catholic universities and colleges in the United States
Former women's universities and colleges in the United States
Seminaries and theological colleges in Connecticut
Universities and colleges in New Haven County, Connecticut
1946 establishments in Connecticut
Catholic universities and colleges in Connecticut
Sisters' colleges
History of women in Connecticut